Walter Edgar Hergesheimer (January 8, 1927 —September 27, 2014) was a Canadian ice hockey forward.

Playing career
In 1944 Hergsheimer lost the index and middle finger on his right hand due to an industrial accident.

Hergesheimer started his National Hockey League career with the New York Rangers. He would also play with the Chicago Black Hawks. His career lasted from 1952 to 1959. His older brother was Phil Hergesheimer (1914–2004), also a professional hockey player. He died of congestive heart failure at St. Boniface Hospital in Winnipeg on September 27, 2014 at the age of 87.

Career statistics

Regular season and playoffs

Awards and achievements
USHL First All-Star Team (1950)
AHL Second All-Star Team (1951)
Dudley "Red" Garrett Memorial Award (Rookie of the Year — AHL) (1951)
Played in NHL All-Star Game (1953 & 1956)
Honoured Member of the Manitoba Hockey Hall of Fame
Honoured Member of the Manitoba Sports Hall of Fame and Museum
 In the 2009 book 100 Ranger Greats, was ranked No. 92 all-time of the 901 New York Rangers who had played during the team's first 82 seasons

References

External links
 
 Wally Hergesheimer's biography at Manitoba Hockey Hall of Fame

1927 births
2014 deaths
Buffalo Bisons (AHL) players
Calgary Stampeders (WHL) players
Canadian ice hockey forwards
Canadian people of German descent
Chicago Blackhawks players
Cleveland Barons (1937–1973) players
Los Angeles Blades (WHL) players
Minneapolis Millers (AHA) players
New York Rangers players
San Francisco Shamrocks (PCHL) players
Ice hockey people from Winnipeg
Winnipeg Rangers players